Bhokraha (Hindi:"भोक्राहा") is a Village Development Committee in Siraha District in the Sagarmatha Zone of south-eastern Nepal. At the time of the 2011 Nepal census it had a population of 1757 people residing in 341 individual households.

References

External links
http://wikimapia.org/#lang=en&lat=26.751282&lon=86.213493&z=14&m=b&show=/21816761/bhokraha-siraha-nepal&search=kalyanpur%20siraha

Populated places in Siraha District